The open-source-software movement is commonly cited to have a diversity problem. In some ways it reflects that of the general gender disparity in computing, but in general is assumed to be even more severe. The same can be extended to the racial and ethnic diversity of the movement. "Diversity" in this article uses the academic Critical Theory definition.

The topic has been and continues to be the subject of significant controversy within the open-source community.

Background 
Open source software (OSS) is a non-traditional model of software development, where source code is created by a number of virtual volunteers and can be modified by other members of the community. The number of developers working on an OSS project can range from few to thousands but often in many projects, only developers deemed trustworthy by the project maintainers will have the privilege of making additions to the main repository.

The software developed is freely available for use and the number of users varies from few to many millions. Over time, as OSS has continued to grow and offer new solutions to everyday problems, an increasingly diverse user base has continued to evolve.  With time and growing usage of OSS projects as new solutions, brings an increasingly diverse user base. In comparison, since the creation of OSS in early 1990's, the community of OSS developers has remained dominated by young men.

Obstacles for inclusion

Hostile Culture 
A common criticism levelled at the open source community is that critiques of code contributed to projects have a tendency to become personal attacks. In GitHub's 2017 survey, 50% of the 5,500 respondents claimed they had witnessed toxic interactions while working on open-source projects, and that 18% of them had suffered through a negative interaction. Dismissive responses, conflict, and unwelcoming language were cited as the third, fourth, and sixth biggest problems with open-source respectively.

An oft-repeated sentiment throughout the community is that conflict isn't widespread, but rather quite visible, due to the public nature of forums and mailing lists. The figures, however, make this idea questionable. Some members of the community have cited the community's toxicity as the main reason for open-source's diversity problem.

Gender Bias 
In 2017, 3 million "pull requests" were examined from 330,000 GitHub users, 21,000 of those were women, and found code written by women to be accepted more often (78.6%) than code written by men (74.6%). In the cases of developers who were not insiders of a project and those whose gender was assumed identifiable by username or profile picture, code by men was approved at higher rates.  The presence of gender bias and its effect on lack of gender diversity within OSS communities is believed true by the researches involved in this project.

Gender diversity 
The more recent entering of women into the OSS movement has been suggested as the cause of their underrepresentation in the field; of all women who had contributed to OSS up until 2013, 38.45% of them began to do so from 2009 to 2013, in comparison to only 18.75% of men.

The gender ratio in open source is even greater than the field-wide gender disparity in computing. This has been found by a number of surveys:
A 2002 survey of 2,784 open-source-software developers found that 1.1% of them were women.
A 2013 survey of 2,183 open-source contributors found that 81.4% were men and 10.4% were women. This survey included both software contributors and non-software contributors and women were much more likely to be non-software contributors.
A 2017 survey of 5,500 contributors to projects on GitHub found that 95% of contributors were men and 3% were women.

In 2015 Red Hat started the Women in Open Source Awards, whose are as follows:

Racial and ethnic diversity 
Developers identifying as ethnic and national minorities, specifically Black people and Latinos are considered to be underrepresented in OSS.

 Of 5,500 Open Source developers surveyed in 2017, the representation of immigrants, from and to anywhere in the world, was 26%.
 While 37.8% of professional computer programmers in the U.S. workforce identified as ethnic or national minorities in 2017, only 16% did in Open Source.

Sexual minority diversity 
A higher percentage of open-source contributors are members of a sexual minority. A 2017 survey of 5,500 GitHub contributors found that 7% were LGBT compared to 4% of the general population. A 2018 survey conducted by StackOverflow found that out of their sample of 100,000, 6.7% identified as LGBT+, and 0.9% as non-binary or trans. This suggests that the open-source community is roughly in line with the software industry's norm.

Notable LGBT+ members of the open-source community include:

 Coraline Ada Ehmke, transgender, creator of the Contributor Covenant.
 Jon "Maddog" Hall, gay, member of The Linux Professional Institute's board and early advocate of Linux.  
 Sage Sharp, non-binary, Linux kernel maintainer until 2015.
 Josh Simmons, bisexual, member of the Open Source Initiative board since 2016.

Organizations and Programs 
LinuxChix is a women-oriented Linux community encouraging participation in Linux OSS by creating conflict-free and nurturing environments for women to do so. The diversity initiative, EquitableTech, targets minorities in OSS by offering skill training for Black and Latino computer science students with goal of increasing diversity in OSS. Several organisations have been set up with the intention of boosting the visibility of the open-source community's LGBT+ members. Examples include Trans*H4ck, Trans Code, and Lesbians Who Tech.Trans*H4CK was the first transgender "hackathon" with goal of bringing awareness to issues specific to the transgender community. After launching in 2013, it has increased visibility of transgender technologists and entrepreneurs in the technology industry.

Programs 

Some FOSS projects have programs to support women.

 Debian: Debian Women
 KDE: KDE Women
 GNOME Project: GNOME Women

The Linux Foundation has a diversity program.

References 

Diversity in computing
Open-source movement